Loon Lake, (Nova Scotia) could mean  the following :

Community
Loon Lake a community in the Halifax Regional Municipality.
East Loon Lake Village  a community in the Halifax Regional Municipality at

Lakes

Cape Breton Regional Municipality
Loon Lake near the community of Broughton at 
Loon Lake near the community of Rear Boisdale at

Digby County
Loon Lake in Clare District at 
Loon Lake in Clare District at

Guysborough County
Loon Lake near the community of Indian Harbour at 
Loon Lake near the community of Goldboro at

Halifax Regional Municipality

Loon Lake (Westphal) in the community of Westphal
Loon Lake near the community of Murchyville at 
Loon Lake near the community of Moose River Gold Mines at 
Loon Lake near the community of Meaghers Grant at 
Loon Lake near the community of Goffs at 
Loon Lake near the community of Hatchet Lake at 
East Loon Lake near the community of Loon Lake at 
West Loon Lake near the community of Loon Lake at 
South Loon Lake near the community of Loon Lake at

Kings County
Loon Lake at

Lunenburg County
Loon Lake near New Ross at

Region of Queens Municipality

Other
Loon Lake Stream a river in Digby County at

References
Geographical Names Board of Canada
Explore HRM
Nova Scotia Placenames

Lakes of Nova Scotia